Austin Iornongu Iwar (born 9 June 1997), better known by his stage name Tay Iwar, is a Nigerian neo soul singer, songwriter, record producer, composer and sound engineer. Iwar signed a licensing deal in 2018 with Soulection, and a publishing deal in 2022 with Warner Chappell Music. He founded the Bantu Collective with his brothers Suté Iwar, and Terna Iwar, and he is a pioneer of the Alté music genre.

He came into the music scene with a critically acclaimed mixtape album Passport, which earned him a nomination at the 3rd and 4th editions of Nigerian Teens Choice Awards in the Choice Mixtape/EP category in 2014 and 2015. On 23 November 2021, Wizkid Made in Lagos deluxe studio album, was nominated at the Grammy and earned him, a special recognition from The Recording Academy.

Early life
Austin Iornongu Iwar was born on 9 June 1997 in Marina, and raised between Lagos and Abuja. Austin, is the son of Austin Iwar (Father), and Vivian Iwar (Mother). His early influence in music, came from his elder brother Suté Iwar. Austin began creating music at age fourteen, using the digital music software FL Studio. In 2015, he spoke about his journey at TED conference in Rivers State.

Career
In 2014, Tay Iwar (formerly Tay) came into the music scene with his brother Suté Iwar. Same year, they created Bantu Collective, an entertainment company in Abuja, for recording, and music distribution, with a photo studio, headed by Terna Iwar. Shortly after, Iwar released his mixtape Passport, on 20 April 2014, through BANTU, and launched his music career on SoundCloud, with a cover of Jai Paul "Zion Wolf", as Tay. Which earned him a nomination at 4th Nigerian Teens Choice Awards for Choice Song of the Year in 2015.

On 22 April 2016, he released a seven-track ep titled Renascentia, featuring Sute Iwar. In 2017, "Equestrian Love" from the extended play Renascentia was on the soundtrack list of Skinny Girl in Transit season 3. Shortly after the premiere of Skinny Girl in Transit season 3 in February, "Equestrian Love" gained popularity and began trending on Twitter, shortly after M.I posted the song, of the moment. On 29 April 2017, he opens for Aṣa, at Encore "Live In Lagos" Concert 2017 at Eko Convention Center in Lagos.

In 2018, Tay Iwar signed a single publshing deal with Universal Music Group Nigeria, alongside Mr Eazi, Tekno, WurlD, Cina Soul, Stonebwoy, and Vanessa Mdee. On 30 January 2018, he released "Video Star", a self-produced track, and his first single under Universal Music Group Nigeria. On 3 February 2018, he released the visual to "Video Star", directed by Director K, for Universal Music Group Nigeria. "Video Star" was shortlisted among the 10 Best Nigerian Songs of the Month, by OkayAfrica. On 17 August 2018, he was credited the record producer, and sound engineer of "504", a song by Jon Ogah, a fake housemate at the 2017 reality television show, Big Brother Naija season 2.

On 26 August 2018, Tay Iwar unveiled his publishing and distribution deal with Soulection, with the release of 1997, a collective of singles including "Space", "Sugardaddy", and "Miracle Girl", under Soulection, as the lead singles off his debut album GEMINI, released on 29 March 2019. The album features guess appearance from Cruel Santino, Preyé, Odunsi (The Engine), and Suté Iwar. "Utero" from the album, earned him a nomination for Best Vocal Performance (Male) at the 14th edition of The Headies. On 13 April 2019, "Diamond", and "Keeps" from GEMINI, studio album was aired on Soulection radio. In 2020, he featured on Wizkid Made in Lagos album, on "True Love", with Projexx.

In 2021, following the release of the deluxe version on 27 August 2021, he co-wrote "Steady" from the deluxe version, which earned him his first nomination at the 64th Annual Grammy Awards, for Best Global Music Album. Same year, he co-wrote "System" for Dave, from We're All Alone in This Together studio album, and was featured on Tiwa Savage Water & Garri EP on "Special Kinda". On 1 December 2021, Tay,  performed "True Love" with Wizkid, for the first time at Made in Lagos Tour in London at The O2 Arena.

On 14 January 2022, he signed a worldwide publishing deal with Warner Chappell Music, through a joint venture with The Flight Club. On 29 March 2022, Wizkid released the music video for "True Love", featuring Tay Iwar, and Projexx. "True Love" was directed by Nabil Elderkin, and starring Jamaican-Canadian model Winnie Harlow, and Wizkid.

Discography

Mixtapes

Studio albums

EPs

Other charted songs

Accolades

Tours
 Made in Lagos Tour (2022)

References

Living people
1997 births
Nigerian alté singers
English-language singers from Nigeria
Nigerian rhythm and blues singers
Singers from Lagos
Residents of Lagos